Barbara Bowman may refer to:
 Barbara A. Bowman (born 1954), American nutritionist
 Barbara H. Bowman (1930–1996), American geneticist
 Barbara T. Bowman (born 1928), American early childhood education expert